Roger Bartlett Swain, (born 5 February 1949, Cambridge, Massachusetts) known as "the man with the red suspenders", is most famous for hosting the television show, The Victory Garden on PBS. He was the host from the mid-1980s until 2001.

He graduated from Harvard College with B.A. in 1971 and M.A. in 1972 and went on to earn in 1977 a Ph.D. from Harvard University in Biology. From 1978 to 2008 he was writer and science editor at Horticulture Magazine. He is the author of five books: Earthly Pleasures, Field Days, The Practical Gardener, Saving Graces, and Groundwork. From 2005-06 he was the co-host of the television show People, Places, and Plants with Paul Tukey on HGTV. Roger was married for 31 years to Elisabeth Ward Swain, who died in February 2008.

References

External links

Roger Swain teaches you how to grown (sic) your own community garden

PBS people
Harvard College alumni
1949 births
Living people
American horticulturists